The Italian destroyer Audace was originally ordered by Japan from Yarrow Shipbuilders in Scotland under the name of Kawakaze, but was transferred to Italy in 1916 while still under construction. She served as the command ship for the radio-controlled target ship  in 1937–1940 and then was rearmed for convoy escort and patrolling duties when World War II began. Audace was captured by the Germans in 1943 and used by them as a minelayer and escort ship in the Adriatic Sea until she was sunk by a pair of British destroyers in late 1944.

Design and description
Her complement was 5 officers and 113 enlisted men.

The ship was powered by two Brown-Curtis steam turbines, each driving one propeller shaft using steam supplied by 3 Yarrow boilers. Her intended German-built diesel cruising engines were not delivered because of the war.

Only two quick-firing (QF) 39-caliber two-pounder anti-aircraft guns had been installed before the ship was transferred to Italy in 1916. The ship's main armament consisted of seven QF Cannon 76/40 Model 1916 guns in single mounts. Audace was also equipped with four  torpedo tubes in twin mounts, one on each broadside.

Construction and career
The Imperial Japanese Navy ordered a pair of s from the British Yarrow Shipbuilders in 1913, and Kawakaze (as the ship was originally named) was laid down on 1 October 1913 at their Scotstoun shipyard. Construction was delayed by a backlog of previous orders and then by the outbreak of World War I in August 1914. The Italians, desperately short of destroyers, began negotiations with the Japanese to acquire Kawakaze and succeeded on 3 July 1916 when they agreed to transfer the ship. The Regia Marina named their new acquisition Intrepido two days later, but renamed her Audace on 25 September. She was launched on 27 September and completed on 1 March 1917. She saw action in the Adriatic Sea during World War I, and was the first Italian ship to enter Trieste at the end of the war, celebrating the final union of the city with Italy (the pier where she moored was renamed Molo Audace, "Audace Pier", and her anchor became part of the Victory Lighthouse).

Audace was reclassified as a torpedo boat on 1 September 1929 and was modified to serve as the command ship of the radio-controlled target ship San Marco from 1937–1940. She was rearmed in 1940 for escort duties with her main armament reduced to three 102-millimeter guns. In 1943 one 102-millimeter gun and the two 2-pounder AA guns were replaced by five /65 Breda Model 35 autocannon in single mounts. Between 1940 and 1943 she was mostly used as an escort in the Adriatic Sea.

The ship left Trieste on 9 September 1943, following the Italian Armistice and the beginning of Operation Achse, intending to reach an Italian or Allied-controlled port in southern Italy; but engine problems forced her to make for Venice, where she was captured on 12 September when the Germans occupied the city. She was then commissioned into the Kriegsmarine and renamed TA20. The Germans augmented her anti-aircraft armament to 20 Breda guns in 10 twin mounts and assigned her to escort and minelaying work in the Adriatic Sea. On 15 March 1944, she laid a minefield south of Ancona and others east of San Giorgio on the night of 17/18 and 29 March. The British destroyers  and  ambushed and sank TA20 and two accompanying corvettes on 1 November south of Lussino in the Adriatic.

References

Bibliography

External links

 Audace (1916) Marina Militare website

 
1916 ships
Ships built on the River Clyde
Destroyers of the Regia Marina
World War I naval ships of Italy
World War II destroyers of Italy
World War II torpedo boats of Germany
Naval ships of Italy captured by Germany during World War II
Maritime incidents in November 1944
World War II shipwrecks in the Mediterranean Sea
Shipwrecks in the Adriatic Sea